"The Great Pretender" is a popular song recorded by The Platters, with Tony Williams on lead vocals, and released as a single in November 1955. The words and music were written by Buck Ram, the Platters' manager and producer who was a successful songwriter before moving into producing and management. The song reached No. 1 on Billboards Top 100, and No. 5 on the UK charts.

The song has been covered by a number of singers, most notably by Freddie Mercury, whose version reached No. 4 on the UK charts. Sam Cooke's cover of the song is believed to have inspired Chrissie Hynde to name her band The Pretenders.

Platters' original
Buck Ram, the manager of The Platters said that he wrote the song in about 20 minutes in the washroom of the Flamingo Hotel in order to have a follow up to the success of "Only You (And You Alone)". Ram had boasted to Bob Shad that he had an even better song than "Only You", and when pressed by Shad on the name of the song, and Ram quickly replied "The Great Pretender". He said the song would be a hit even before he had written the song to go with the title. The song was recorded by The Platters and released in November 1955. Plas Johnson played tenor saxophone on the recording. It became the best-selling R&B song in January 1956, and reached No. 2 on the Top 100 chart on Billboard in February 1956.  It was also the 12th best-selling singles of 1956.

The Platters performed "The Great Pretender" and "Only You" in the 1956 musical film Rock Around the Clock., and was also in the film American Graffiti.

In 2004, the song was ranked 360th in The 500 Greatest Songs of All Time by Rolling Stone.

Charts

Freddie Mercury's version 

The song was repopularized in 1987 by Freddie Mercury, the lead singer of the rock band Queen. Mercury's version reached No. 4 in the UK Singles Chart. In one of his last videotaped interviews in spring of 1987, Mercury explained that the song was particularly fitting for the way he saw his career and being on stage.

Mercury's original music video for the song featured him parodying himself in many of his Queen guises through video medium over the years, including visual re-takes of "Radio Ga Ga", "Crazy Little Thing Called Love", "It's a Hard Life", "I Want to Break Free", "Bohemian Rhapsody", "I Was Born to Love You", and "Made in Heaven". It was directed by David Mallet in February 1987, and also featured fellow Queen member Roger Taylor and actor Peter Straker in drag.  The video was also notable for Mercury having shaved off his trademark moustache, which he had sported for much of the 1980s. In 1992, Brian Malouf remixed the song for the film Night and The City and a new edit of the video was produced using clips from the film.

Wit Studio's original anime television series "Great Pretender" uses this version as its ending theme.

Personnel
Freddie Mercury: lead vocals and backing vocals
Mike Moran: synthesizers
Alan Jones: bass
Harold Fisher: drums

Charts

Weekly charts

Year-end charts

Jimmy Parkinson's versions
The song was covered in the UK by Australian vocalist Jimmy Parkinson. It entered the Top 20 on March 3, 1956, six months before the Platters' version; Parkinson's version peaked at No. 9 and remained in the Top 20 for ten weeks.

Other covers

Stan Freberg recorded a parody of the Platters' song.
 Roy Orbison recorded the song for his 1962 album Crying.
The Band recorded a version of "The Great Pretender" in their 1973 album Moondog Matinee, an album consisting solely of covers, with Richard Manuel on lead vocals.
Dolly Parton included a version on her 1984 album of the same name.
 Raul Seixas recorded a version in 1973 for his album Os_24_Maiores_Sucessos_da_Era_do_Rock.

References

External links

 Lyrics of Freddie Mercury cover at Queen official website (from Greatest Hits III)

1955 singles
1987 singles
Number-one singles in the United States
Billboard Top 100 number-one singles
Grammy Hall of Fame Award recipients
The Platters songs
Freddie Mercury songs
Sam Cooke songs
Number-one singles in Australia
Songs written by Buck Ram
1955 songs
Mercury Records singles
Music videos directed by David Mallet (director)